The 1934 Vermont gubernatorial election took place on November 6, 1934. Incumbent Republican Stanley C. Wilson did not run for re-election to a third term as Governor of Vermont. Republican candidate Charles M. Smith defeated Democratic candidate James P. Leamy to succeed him.

Republican primary

Results

Democratic primary

Results

General election

Results

References

Vermont
1934
Gubernatorial
November 1934 events